This is a list of 300 parliamentary constituencies currently represented in the Jatiya Sangsad, the unicameral national legislature of Bangladesh. Each constituency is represented by a single Member of Parliament.  The Jatiya Sangsad of Bangladesh consists of 350 seats, of which 50 seats are reserved for women, who are elected by the 300 directly elected members on the basis of procedure of proportional representation in the Parliament through single transferable vote.

The Bangladesh Election Commission is made responsible to "delimit the constituencies for the purpose of elections to Parliament" by the Constitution of Bangladesh (chapter VII, article 119).  It also says, "There shall be one electoral roll for each constituency for the purposes of elections to Parliament, and no special electoral roll shall be prepared so as to classify electors according to religion, race caste or sex" (article 121).

The current list, published by the Bangladesh Election Commission in 2018 as per the provisions of the Delimitation of Constituencies Ordinance, 1976 is as follows:

Distribution of constituency across division and district

Rangpur Division

Rajshahi Division

Khulna Division

Barisal Division

Mymensingh Division

Dhaka Division

Sylhet Division

Chittagong Division

Notes

External links
 A map of constituencies of the Jatiya Sangsad
 Maps of electoral districts
 

 
Parliamentary
Bangladesh